The Elgin Watch Makers were a minor league baseball team based in Elgin, Illinois in 1915. Elgin teams played as members of the Class D level Northern Association in 1910 and Bi-State League in 1915, winning the 1910 league championship. Elgin played as the Elgin "Kittens" in 1910 in a shortened season, with the nickname being a tribute to manager Mal Kittridge. The Elgin minor league teams hosted home games at Trout Park.

History
Minor league baseball began with the 1910 Elgin Kittens, who played as charter members of the eight–team Class D level Northern Association, which folded during the 1910 season.  Elgin joined the Clinton Teddies, Decatur Commodores, Freeport Pretzels, Jacksonville Jacks, Joliet Jolly-ites, Kankakee Kays and Muscatine Pearl Finders in beginning league play on May 10, 1910.

Elgin ended the 1910 shortened season with the best record in the Northern Association.

Elgin pitchers threw two no-hitters during the 1910 season, occurring just weeks apart in May, with both against the Freeport Pretzels. On May 13, 1910, Cy Boothby of Elgin threw the first franchise no–hitter, defeating Freeport 7–2. On May 30, 1910, Earl Wilson threw a no–hitter in defeating the Pretzels 3–0.

The Northern Association folded on July 17, 1910. At the time the league folded, the Kittens had a record of 37–20, finishing first in the standings under player/manager Mal Kittridge. Kittridge was a former player of the nearby Chicago Cubs and was the namesake of the "Kittens" moniker. Elgin had folded on July 11, 1910 on the same day as the Kankee Kays, contributing to the demise of the league. Playing home games at Trout Park, Elgin finished 0.5 game ahead of the second place Muscatine Pearl Finders in the final standings. Fritz Maisel of Elgin led the Northern Association in runs scored with 49 and teammate Buck Hopkins led the league with 7 home runs. The Northern Association did not return to play in 1911.

In 1915 Elgin resumed minor league play when the Elgin "Watch Makers" became charter members of the Bi-State League, which formed as a Class D level league. Elgin began the 1915 season playing with the Aurora Foxes, Freeport Pretzels, Ottawa Indians, Racine Belles and Streator Boosters in the six–team league. The league began play on May 11, 1915.

The use of the "Watch Makers" moniker was in reference to local industry in the era. Elgin, Illinois was home to the Elgin National Watch Company, which was founded in 1863.

The Bi–State League permanently folded on July 7, 1915, during its first season of play. The Watch Makers had a 27–26 record and were in third place in the Bi–State League standings when the league folded. Denny Blake served as manager, as Elgin finished 5.5 games behind the first place Streator Boosters in the final standings. Streator was followed by the Racine Belles (30–20), Elgin Watch Makers (27–26), Aurora Foxes (25–27), Freeport Pretzels (23–29), and Ottawa Indians (20–35) in the standings.

The Bi-State League did not return to play in 1916. Elgin, Illinois has not hosted another minor league team.

The ballpark
The Elgin minor league teams reportedly played home games at Trout Park. Today, Trout Park is still in use as a public park with ballfields. It is located at 576 Trout Park Boulevard, Elgin, Illinois.

Timeline

Year–by–year records

Notable alumni

Bill Burwell (1915)
Malachi Kittridge (1910, MGR)
Fritz Maisel (1910) Set MLB record with 74 stolen bases
Ray Mowe (1910)

See also
Elgin Kittens playersElgin Watch Makers players

References

External links
Elgin - Baseball Reference

Defunct minor league baseball teams
Professional baseball teams in Illinois
Defunct baseball teams in Illinois
Baseball teams established in 1915
Baseball teams disestablished in 1915
1915 disestablishments in Illinois
Bi-State League teams
Elgin, Illinois
1915 establishments in Illinois